SS Hudson was a steel-hulled package freighter that served on the Great Lakes from her construction in 1887 to her sinking in 1901. On September 16, 1901, while heading across Lake Superior with a cargo of wheat and flax, she ran into a storm and sank with the loss of all 25 crew off Eagle Harbor, Michigan (located on the Keweenaw Peninsula).

In all likelihood, she is the second deepest shipwreck on the Great Lakes, behind the bulk freighter Scotiadoc (discovered in 2013 at a depth of ), and tied with the composite bulk freighter S.R. Kirby (discovered in 2018).

History

Construction

Hudson (Official number 95953) was designed by Frank E. Kirby and was built in 1888 by the Detroit Dry Dock Company of Wyandotte, Michigan. She was launched on November 16/17, 1887 as hull number 82. She cost $275,000 to build.

She had a gross register tonnage of 2294.14 tons, a net register tonnage of 1853.37 tons and a cargo capacity of 2,650 tons.

The engine was powered by steam provided by two  by  Scotch marine boilers, which had a working pressure of 160 psi; both the engine and the boilers were built by the Detroit Engine Works of Detroit, Michigan. She had an identical sister ship named Harlem.

Service history
Hudson was built for the Western Transit Company (a subsidiary of the New York Central Railway Company) of Buffalo, New York. On May 9, 1888 she was enrolled in Detroit, but on May 15, 1888 she was re-registered to Buffalo.

On October 24, 1890, while in Duluth, Minnesota, Hudson collided with the wooden steam barge City of Nicolet, sending her to the bottom of Lake Superior.

Final voyage
On September 15, 1901, Hudson left Duluth under the command of Captain Angus J. McDonald, with a cargo of wheat and flax bound for Buffalo. Around the time she passed the Apostle Islands, a storm had kicked up. On the morning of September 16, 1901, several lighthouse keepers in Eagle River, Michigan reported seeing Hudson dead in the water in listing badly. Eventually, she rolled over and sank, taking the lives of all 25 (some sources state 24) crew members.

Aftermath
One report after the sinking stated that the identity of the ship was a mystery, and it was believed that another ship sighted in the area may have rescued the crew of Hudson. Another report stated that due to the lack of wreckage, the sinking of Hudson was "probably a mistake". But on September 20, 1901, a fishing boat found two masts, one painted black and the other yellow, which matched the colour of Hudsons masts. Over the next few days, much more wreckage, and a few bodies from Hudson came ashore.

After her sinking, it was speculated that her cargo shifted, causing her to roll over and leading to her sinking. It was also believed that she may have had engine trouble, which could also have contributed to her sinking.

At the time of her loss, Hudson was valued at $180,000.

Hudson wreck

Wreck discovery
In mid-2019, Jerry Eliason of Cloquet, Minnesota and Kraig Smith of Rice Lake, Wisconsin were searching for the wrecks of Hudson, the paddle steamer Sunbeam and the composite bulk freighter S.R. Kirby, which had already been found by the Great Lakes Shipwreck Historical Society (GLSHS) in June 2018, but had not yet been made public. In mid-July, they set out to the target . When they were above the wreck, they dropped a camera attached to a  cable. After passing over the wreck a few times, the camera picked up the letters HUD on the vessel's stern, confirming that the wreck was Hudson. Discovery of her wreck was made public in September 2019.

Hudson today
All that remains is her steel hull, because when she sank, her cabins broke free and floated away. Due to the depth of her wreck, she is almost impossible for divers to explore.

References

1887 ships
Maritime incidents in 1890
Maritime incidents in 1901
Ships lost with all hands
Shipwrecks of Lake Superior
Shipwrecks of the Michigan coast
Merchant ships of the United States
2019 archaeological discoveries
Shipwreck discoveries by Jerry Eliason, Ken Merryman and Kraig Smith
Ships built in Wyandotte, Michigan
Package freighters
Ships sunk in storms